Eleutherodactylus ventrilineatus is a species of frog in the family Eleutherodactylidae. It is endemic to Haiti and only known from the Pic Macaya and Pic Formon (Massif de la Hotte) at elevations of  asl. Its natural habitats are open areas in montane closed pine and cloud forests. It is threatened by habitat loss caused by logging and agriculture. It is known from the Pic Macaya National Park, but habitat degradation is occurring in the park too.

References

ventrilineatus
Amphibians described in 1936
Endemic fauna of Haiti
Amphibians of Haiti
Taxa named by Benjamin Shreve
Taxonomy articles created by Polbot